Fort McMurray/Mildred Lake Airport  is located adjacent to Mildred Lake and  north of Fort McMurray, Alberta, Canada.

See also
List of airports in the Fort McMurray area

References

External links
Page about this airport on COPA's Places to Fly airport directory

Registered aerodromes in Fort McMurray
Transport in the Regional Municipality of Wood Buffalo